Christopher David Holstein (born 19 May 1958), a former Australian politician, was a member of the New South Wales Legislative Assembly representing Gosford for the Liberal Party from 2011 to 2015.

Early years and background
Holstein has lived on the Central Coast since he was eight years of age, attending Gosford High School. His family has small businesses in the area and he became involved in local politics following flooding in the Narara Valley area in 1989. Elected to Gosford City Council in 1991 initially as an independent Councillor, Holstein then later served as Mayor between 2002 and 2010, and during some of his time on Council, he represented the Liberal Party.

Holstein is married with five children and lives in the Narara Valley on the New South Wales Central Coast.

State political career
Holstein sought political office on several occasions prior to achieving success in 2011. In 2003, he ran as an independent candidate for Peats (now abolished) against Labor sitting member Marie Andrews. Holstein was excluded on the final distribution of preferences in favour of the Liberal candidate, and the seat was retained by Andrews. In 2007, he ran as the Liberal candidate for Gosford, again against Labor's Andrews. Holstein gained 45.1 per cent of the two-party vote and the seat was retained by Andrews.

Holstein was successful on the third occasion of running at the 2011 state election, again in Gosford, he achieved a swing of 15.4 points and won the seat with 61.9 per cent of the two-party vote. Holstein was part of a team labeled by the media as the 'Awesome Foursome' who won all four Central Coast seats for the Liberals at the 2011 State election.

References

 

Liberal Party of Australia members of the Parliament of New South Wales
Members of the New South Wales Legislative Assembly
Living people
1958 births
21st-century Australian politicians
Shire Presidents and Mayors of Gosford